Chan Rithy (born November 11, 1983) is a Cambodian former footballer who last played for Cambodia Tiger in the Cambodian League. He plays as a midfielder for club. He used to play for Cambodia national football team from 2004 to 2011 with 23 caps and 5 goals.

International goals

Honours
2008 Cambodian League Winner
2008 Hun Sen Cup Winner
2009 Hun Sen Cup Winner
2012 Cambodian League Winner

External links
Chan Rithy cambodianfootball profile

1983 births
Living people
Cambodia international footballers
Cambodian expatriate footballers
Cambodian footballers
Phnom Penh Crown FC players
Expatriate footballers in Thailand
Chan Rithy
Boeung Ket Rubber Field players
Association football midfielders
Angkor Tiger FC players